Netherfield can refer to a number of locations in England:

Netherfield, Nottinghamshire
Netherfield, a village in Battle, East Sussex
Netherfield, Milton Keynes, a housing estate in Woughton, Buckinghamshire

See also
Kendal Town F.C. were originally called Netherfield AFC
Netherfield is a fictional estate in Jane Austen's novel Pride and Prejudice